Oil City Armory is a historic National Guard armory located at Oil City, Venango County, Pennsylvania.  It was built in 1914, and consists of a two-story administration section with a taller two-story drill hall in a Late Victorian style. The administration section has a taller three-story, corner, polygonal office tower with Gothic-influenced window surrounds. The drill hall measures 70 by 72 feet and has a roof supported by Pratt trusses.

It was added to the National Register of Historic Places in 1991.  It is located in the Oil City South Side Historic District.

References

Armories on the National Register of Historic Places in Pennsylvania
Infrastructure completed in 1914
Buildings and structures in Oil City, Pennsylvania
National Register of Historic Places in Venango County, Pennsylvania